Specklinia guanacastensis is a species of orchid plant native to Costa Rica.

References 

guanacastensis
Flora of Costa Rica